Constituency PB-1 (Musakhail-cum-Sherani) is a Constituency of Provincial Assembly of Punjab as per Final Delimitation 2018 MAPS is made up of old Constituency PB-15 (Musakhail) and part of PB-18 (Sherani/Zhob)

2018 Pakistani general election

See also

 Balochistan ,Pakistan

References

External links
 Election commission Pakistan's official website
 Election Pakistan  check result
 Official Website of Government of Balochistan

Constituencies of Balochistan